Georges Corm is a Lebanese economist. He served as minister of finance in the government of Salim Hoss from 1998 to 2000.

He studied at the Institut d'Etudes Politiques de Paris (1958-1961) where he graduated in Public Finance and has also a PhD from Paris University in Constitutional Law (1969).

His books have been translated into several languages. In 2018, he was the recipient of the Prix de l'essai for his work La Nouvelle Question d’Orient.

Select bibliography
 Le Nouveau Gouvernement du Monde (Idéologies, Structures, Contre-Pouvoirs) (La Découverte, 2010)
 L’Europe et le Mythe de l’Occident (La Construction d’une Histoire) (La Découverte, 2009)
 Histoire du Moyen-Orient (De l'Antiquité à nos jours) (La Découverte/Poche, 2007)
 Le Proche-Orient éclaté (1956–2012) (Gallimard/Histoire)
 Orient-Occident, la fracture imaginaire (La découverte, 2002 et 2004)
 L'Europe et l'Orient : de la balkanisation à la libanisation. Histoire d'une modernité inaccomplie (La découverte, 1998,2001 et 2003)
 Le Liban contemporain. Histoire et société (La découverte, 2003 et 2005)
 Histoire du pluralisme religieux dans le bassin méditerranéen (Geuthner, 1998)
 Le Nouveau Désordre économique mondial (La découverte, 1993)
 La Mue (roman, 1989)
 Le Moyen-Orient (Flammarion/dominos, 1994)
 La Question religieuse au XXIe siècle. Géopolitique et crise de la post-modernité (La découverte, 2006)
 Le nouveau gouvernement du monde - Idéologies, structures, contre-pouvoirs (La découverte, 2010)

References

External links
 Corm's personal website

20th-century Lebanese historians
20th-century Lebanese writers
21st-century Lebanese historians
Finance ministers of Lebanon
Lebanese Maronites
Lebanese expatriates in France
Lebanese economists
Living people
Academic staff of Saint Joseph University
Lebanese Arab nationalists
1940 births